Boortsog or bawïrsaq is a type of fried dough food found in the cuisines of Central Asia, Idel-Ural, Mongolia and the Middle East. It is shaped into either triangles or sometimes spheres. The dough consists of flour, yeast, milk, eggs, butter, salt, sugar,  margarine. Tajik boortsog are often decorated with a criss-cross pattern by pressing the bottom of a small strainer on the dough before it is fried.

Boortsog is often eaten as a dessert, with syrup or jam or honey. They may be thought of as cookies or biscuits, and since they are fried, they are sometimes compared to doughnuts. Mongolians and Turkic peoples sometimes dip boortsog in tea. In Central Asia, baursaki are often eaten alongside chorba.

Uštipci are doughnut-like fried dough balls popular in Bosnia and Herzegovina, Croatia, Macedonia, Serbia, especially in Vojvodina, Srem district and Slovenia where they are known as "miške".

Preparation

Dough for Boortsog ranges in ingredients from a simple dough, to a sweeter, crispier dough. For example, a typical Kyrgyz recipe calls for one part butter, 7 parts salt water, and 6 parts milk, along with yeast and flour, while more complex recipes add eggs and sugar. Also the dough could be made with Kaymak.

Boortsog are made by cutting the flattened dough into pieces.  While not usually done in Central Asia, these pieces may be bent and knotted into various shapes before being deep fried.  This is especially common among Mongolians.  The dough is deep-fried golden brown. Mutton fat is traditionally used by Mongolians to give the boortsog extra flavor, but vegetable oil may be substituted.

World records 
The biggest (179 kg) baursak was cooked April 20, 2014 in Ufa, Russia. 1,006 eggs, 25 kg of sugar, 70 kg of flour, 50 kg of Bashkir honey were used for its preparation. A Guinness record was made in Almaty, September 7, 2014, during the celebration of Mother's Day, when 856 kilograms of baursaks were cooked in one place in one day. The celebration was held in the form of a culinary battle between teams of mothers-in-law and daughters-in-law. Seven teams participated in the competition.

Gallery

See also

 List of doughnut varieties
 List of fried dough varieties 
 Lokma
 Youtiao
 Chak-chak
 List of quick breads
 Shelpek – in a shape of a flat-bread
 Frybread
 Odading
 Uštipci

Bibliography

References

External links

Recipe
Recipe
Recipe
Kyrgyz frying boorsoq
 My Home - Tatar cuisine recipes

Doughnuts
Altai cuisine
Buryat cuisine
Bashkir cuisine
Kalmyk cuisine
Kazakhstani cuisine
Kyrgyz cuisine
Mongolian cuisine
Russian cuisine
Soviet cuisine
Tajik cuisine
Tatar cuisine
Turkmenistan cuisine
Tuvan cuisine
Uzbekistani cuisine
Yeast breads
Milk dishes
Turkish breads
Central Asian desserts

de:Mongolische Küche